91st meridian may refer to:

91st meridian east, a line of longitude east of the Greenwich Meridian
91st meridian west, a line of longitude west of the Greenwich Meridian

91st Meridian, an electronic publication of the International Writing Program at the University of Iowa